The 1969 Buenos Aires tennis tournament was a professional tennis tournament held in Buenos Aires, Argentina that started on 11 November 1969. François Jauffret won the singles title.

Finals

Singles

 François Jauffret defeated  Željko Franulović 3–6, 6–2, 6–4, 6–3
 It was Jauffret's only ATP title of the year and the 1st of his ATP career.

Doubles

 Patricio Cornejo /  Jaime Fillol Sr. defeated  Roy Emerson /  Frew McMillan 6–3, 9–7, 9–7
 It was Cornejo's only ATP title of the year and the 1st of his ATP career. It was Fillol's only ATP title of the year and the 1st of his ATP career.

References

External links 
 ITF tournament edition details

 
Buenos Aires tennis tournament
Davis
1969 in Argentine tennis
ATP Buenos Aires